Alexander McCracken (7 May 1856 – 25 August 1915), an influential sports administrator with the Essendon Football Club, was the first president of the Victorian Football League.

Family
The son of Robert McCracken (1813-1885), the brewer and first president of the Essendon Football Club, and Margaret McCracken (1831-1905), née Hannay, Alexander McCracken was born in Melbourne on 7 May 1856.

His brother John (1853-1879) became Essendon's first team captain, and his cousin Coiler McCracken (1848-1915), became Essendon's second captain.

Alexander McCracken married Mary Elizabeth (1863-1938), a daughter of John Murray Peck — co-founder of Cobb and Co, and vice-president of the Essendon Football Club from 1898 to 1905 — on 19 July 1884. The has two sons, and three daughters: Alec Lindsay McCracken (1885-1959), Joy Margaret Louisa McCracken (1886-1945), Murray Robert McCracken (1888-1964), Jean Mary McCracken (1890-1983), and Madge Huntington McCracken (1891-1967).

Education

He attended Melbourne's Scotch College in East Melbourne from 1869 to 1871.

McCracken's Brewery
He was the head of McCracken's Breweries, until May 1907 when the company, along with five other brewing firms, was merged into Carlton & United Breweries Limited. He was appointed a Director of the new company.

Football
Alex McCracken played a number of times for the Essendon Football Club in the four pre-VFA years (1873-1876) with his brother, John, and his cousin, Coiler, and also in the club's first season in the VFA 1877, when the team was captained by his cousin.
"The brothers McCracken, of the wealthy brewing firm, with A. Graham as treasurer, were the heart and soul of the [Essendon Football] club at the beginning. Mr. Alexander McCracken (one of the most distinguished of Victorian sportsmen) was hon. secretary, player, and later president for the greater part of his life, in spite of his racing interests, and the huge business organisation he controlled, relinquishing his official connection with the club only to assume the more important position of president of the Victorian League. This he held until just before he passed away  . . ." (The Referee, 6 August 1917)

Organisations and Associations
He was deeply involved in various sporting/social.commercial organizations as administrator, founder, and/or patron, including:

 First secretary of the Essendon Football Club (at the age of 17).
 First president of the Victorian Football League (VFL).
Elected at the VFL's first official meeting on 12 April 1897 he retired (due to ill-health) just before his death in 1915.
 President of the Essendon Literary and Debating Society.
 President of the Essendon Poultry, Dog, Pigeon and Canary Society.
 President of the Essendon Town Fire Brigade.
 President of the Brewers' Club of Melbourne.
 Founder of the Essendon Cricket Club.
 Founder and president of the Essendon Rowing Club.
 Founder of the Essendon Tennis Club.
 Founder of the Oaklands Hunt Club.
 Chairman of the Brewers' Association of Victoria (1901).
 Chairman of the Manufacturers' Bottle Co. of Victoria (1903).
 Chairman of the Liquor Trades Defence Union (1903).
 Chairman of the Royal Agricultural Society of Victoria (1909-1915).
 Vice-President of the Essendon Golf Club.
 Vice-President of the North Suburban Cycling Club.
 Vice-President of the Victorian Racing Club.
 Patron of the Essendon Bowling Club.
 Director of the Trustees Executors & Agency Co. Ltd.
 Director of the Victoria Insurance Co.

Politics
In 1894 McCracken, as a Free-Trade Democratic Association candidate, stood against the incumbent MLA, Alfred Deakin (Independent), for the Victorian Legislative Assembly seat of Essendon and Flemington.
Mr. A. M'Cracken met a number of his friends yesterday at the city committee rooms, Queen Street, and promptly upon the heels of the public announcement to stand come many and cordial offers of assistance. As most of his intimate friends knew that he had no desire to oppose Mr. Deakin with whom he was personally friendly, the overtures came first from the opposite end of the district to that in which Mr. M'Cracken resides. He at first declined the request to stand, but when it was again made in more representative form and his more intimate friends reminded him that it was not a question of personal friendship but of public duty, he placed himself unreservedly in the hands of the electors, and one of the first men informed of that step was Mr. Deakin. Probably no battle in the campaign will be fought on more honourable lines than between the two chief aspirants for the Essendon seat. — The Argus, 7 September 1894.

Soundly defeated by Deakin — "The easy win of Mr Deakin in Essendon and Flemington was somewhat of a surprise, for it was expected that Mr M'Cracken would run him much more closely than he did. [At the declaration of the poll] Mr Deakin's majority of nearly 2 to 1 was received with loud cheering." (The Argus, 21 September 1894) — McCracken did not attempt to enter politics ever again.

Properties
The Essendon football Club was refused the use of Windy Hill and played its first few seasons (probably near Filson St) on Robert McCracken's "Ailsa".

He built a mansion home called "North Park", now the Columban Mission, on the south side of Woodland St, Essendon.

Alexander had a country estate called "Cumberland"; and it was, with the Inverness Hotel and Alister Clark's "Glenara", a venue for after hunt celebrations until the Oaklands Hunt Club bought "Sherwood" in Somerton Rd. After Alexander's death, the Johnsons of "Glendewar", across the creek from "Cumberland" moved into Alexander's property.

Death
He died at his North Essendon residence, "North Park", on 25 August 1915 and was buried on 27 August 1915, in a private ceremony, at Melbourne General Cemetery.
DEATH OF MR. A. McCRACKEN.Universal regret was expressed at the announcement of the death of Mr. A. McCracken, at his residence, North Park, Essendon, on August 25.Until his retirement a few months ago he was connected with the League since its inception, filling the office of president from 1897 to 1915 inclusive.It is no exaggeration to say that the League's success has been due in a great measure to his judgment, tact, and courtesy. Mr. McCracken in his young days was a keen footballer and supporter of the game.In later years he was a generous patron, always displaying a close interest in the sport, being held in the highest esteem by footballers and the public.The present Essendon League club first played in his father's paddock, and Mr. McCracken was the club's first secretary, and later on became president. — Jack Worrall, 4 September 1915.

"Legends of Essendon"
McCracken was one of the inaugural 10 "Legends" of the Essendon Football Club Hall of Fame.

Footnotes

References

 Aldous, Grant, The Stop-over That Stayed: A History Of Essendon, City of Essendon, 1988. 
 Bragiola, Alex (Frost, Leonore, ed.). The Fine Homes of Essendon and Flemington, 1846-1880, Essendon Historical Society, (Moonee Ponds), 2010. 
 Cameron-Kennedy, D.F., The Oaklands Hunt, 1888-1988: A Chronicle of Events, D.F. Cameron-Kennedy, (Melbourne), 1989. 
 Gellie, G.H., "McCracken, Alexander (1856–1915)", in Nairn, Bede & Serle, Geoffrey (eds.), Australian Dictionary of Biography, Volume 10: 1891–1939, Lat–Ner, Melbourne University Press, (Carlton) 1986.
 Mancini, Anne & Hibbins, Gillian Mary, Running with the Ball: Football's Foster Father, Lynedoch Publications, 1987.
 Maplestone, M., Flying Higher: History of the Essendon Football Club 1872–1996, Essendon Football Club, (Melbourne), 1996. 
 Peck, Harry H., Memoirs of a Stockman, Stock and Land Publishing Company, (Melbourne), 1942.
 Ross, J. (ed), 100 Years of Australian Football 1897–1996: The Complete Story of the AFL, All the Big Stories, All the Great Pictures, All the Champions, Every AFL Season Reported, Viking, (Ringwood), 1996. 
 7. The First Essendon Team, 1873, The Weekly Times, (Saturday, 5 October 1912), p.29 — Alexander McCracken is at the centre of the second row, wearing a cap, and in front of the player holding the football.
 The Essendon Football Team: League Premiers, The Leader, (Saturday, 5 October 1912), p.31 — Alexander McCracken is at the centre of the front row, holding the football.
 Essendon Football Club Premiers 1891, collection of the State Library of Victoria — Alexander McCracken is at the centre.
 The Late Mr. Alexander McCracker, The Australasian, (Saturday, 4 September 1915), p.17 - photograph.
 Coiler McCracken, at Demonwiki.

1856 births
1915 deaths
Australian Presbyterians
People educated at Scotch College, Melbourne
Essendon Football Club administrators
VFL/AFL administrators
Australian brewers
19th-century Australian businesspeople
Burials at Melbourne General Cemetery
Businesspeople from Melbourne